Hungarians in the United Kingdom include Hungarian-born immigrants to the UK and their descendants, of whom there are a substantial number. Since Hungary joined the European Union in 2004, the UK's Hungarian population has grown significantly. Although official ONS estimates are that there were about 98,000 Hungarians living in the UK in 2019, other organisations estimate that the correct number is about 200,000.

History

The first Hungarian student known by name to have matriculated at Oxford University was one Nicolaus de Ungeria, and it is likely that he spent some time in London. Scores of Hungarian students came to study at English and Scottish universities, but the first to settle in London for good was János Bánffyhunyadi (1576–1646) in 1608. He dabbled in alchemy and became a lecturer in chemistry at Gresham College. Marrying an Englishwoman, he had a house in London, and was often visited by fellow countrymen passing through. In 1659, after a short spell in Oxford, Pál Jászberényi settled in London, where he opened a public school for the children of noblemen. He taught them Latin, using innovative techniques. One of the most resourceful scholars who made their home in London at the time of Pepys and Wren was János Mezolaki. He was teaching Latin and philosophy, and died as a patient of Bedlam, in 1693.

As with other displaced persons from Central Europe, many Hungarians came to Britain during and after World War II. Furthermore, up to 200,000 Hungarians left their home country after the revolution of 1956, and settled in other countries across the Western world — especially those that formed the Western Bloc. This included refugees to the UK, such as the actor Sandor Elès.

Since Hungary joined the European Union in 2004, the UK's Hungarian population has grown significantly. It was estimated that 13,159 Hungarian-born people were resident in the UK at the time of the 2001 UK Census. According to the 2011 census there were 48,308 Hungarian-born residents in England and Wales. 17,803 were in London where they made up 0.22% of the population. Just 576 were in North East England, making up 0.02% of the population there. The Hungarian-born population in England and Wales was 0.5% of the population of Hungary. By comparison the Polish-born population of 579,121 was 1.5% of the population of Poland. The Polish-born population is more spread-out around England and Wales. 55% of the Hungarian-born population were in London and South East England, compared to 41% of the Polish-born population and 30% of the total population. There were also 2,943 Hungarian-born residents in Scotland out of a total population of 5,295,403 (0.06%), and 999 Hungarian-born residents in Northern Ireland out of a total population of 1,810,863 (0.06%). This gives a 2011 census total for the whole of the United Kingdom of 52,250.

The Office for National Statistics estimated that in 2019 there were 98,000 Hungarian-born people resident in the UK: 47,000 males and 50,000 females. However, there are other estimates that between 200,000 and 220,000 Hungarians were living in the UK in 2020.

Notable Hungarian immigrants and Britons of Hungarian origin

Literature and media
 Oscar Deutsch (1893–1941) – founder of Odeon Cinemas
 Frank Furedi (Füredi Ferenc) – commentator
 John Halas (Halász János) (1912 – 1995) – animator
 Arthur Koestler (Kösztler Artur) (1905–1983) – novelist, journalist
 Sir Alexander Korda (1893-1956) – producer, director
 Sebastian Gorka Military and Intelligence Analyst, Trump Administration Advisor, Social Commentator
 Mina Loy – artist, poet, playwright, novelist
 George Mikes (Mikes György) (1912–1987) – writer
 Baroness Emma Orczy (Orczy Emma) (1865–1947) – writer
 Emeric Pressburger (1902–1988) – screenwriter, film director, producer
 Egon Ronay (Rónay Egon) (1915–2010) – food critic
 Petronella Wyatt – journalist
 George Szirtes – poet

Musicians and performers
 Miki Berenyi – singer, songwriter (Lush)
 Joe Bugner (born József Kreul Bugner in 1950) - actor and former Heavyweight boxer 
 Sandor Elès (1936–2002) – actor
 Justine Frischmann – artist, musician (Elastica)
 Stephen Fry – writer, actor
 Romola Garai – actress
 Leslie Howard (1893–1943) – actor
 Princess Julia (born Julia Fodor) – DJ, music writer
 Kerry Katona – singer
 Mark Knopfler – singer, songwriter (Dire Straits)
 Michael McIntyre – comedian 
 Edina Ronay – fashion designer, former actress
 Steve Sarossy – actor
 Catherine Schell – actress
 Georgia Slowe – actress
 Sir Georg Solti (Solti György) (1912–1997) – conductor
 Rachel Weisz – actress

Politicians
 Leo Amery (1873-1955) – Conservative Party politician

Science

 Dennis Gabor, CBE, FRS (Gábor Dénes) (1900–1979) – Nobel Prize–winning physicist
 Ernő Goldfinger (1902–1987) – architect, furniture designer
 Nicholas Kurti, FRS (1908–1988) – physicist
 Imre Lakatos (1922–1974) – philosopher
 Michael Polanyi (Polányi Mihály) (1891–1976) – scientist, polymath
 Sir Marc Aurel Stein (Stein Aurél) (1862–1943) – orientalist

Business
George Soros (born 1930) – investor, business magnate, and philanthropist

Sport
Dominik Kozma, swimmer
Johanna Konta, tennis player
Conrad Balatoni, football player
Tibor Szabo, football player
Sammie Szmodics, football player of Irish descent
Rebeka Simon, swimmer
Callum Styles, football player
Imre Varadi, football player of Italian descent

See also
Hungarian diaspora
Hungary–United Kingdom relations

References

Bibliography
 Zakar, Dr. Andras: The Persecution of Jews in Hungary and the Catholic Church

External links 
 Oxford Hungarian Society
 Hungarian Cultural Centre
 Hungarian Embassy UK 

 
United Kingdom
Immigration to the United Kingdom by country of origin